The Li Zijian Art Museum is an art museum located in Yuelu District of Changsha, Hunan, China. It is adjacent to Yanghu Wetland Park and Xiangjiang New Area Planning Exhibition Hall. Li Zijian Art Museum is the largest private art museum in Hunan.

History
Groundbreaking began in May 2014 for the Li Zijian Art Museum in Yuelu District. Construction began in December 2014 and completed on October 1, 2016.

Collections

Li Zijian Oil Painting Exhibition Hall
The second and third floors of Area A of the Li Zijian Oil Painting Exhibition Hall house the oil paintings by Li Zijian, about 338 in total.

Chen Xichuan Sketch Exhibition Hall
The second floor of Area B of the Chen Xichuan Sketch Exhibition Hall include over 50 sketches by Chen Xichuan, who is a sketch painter and Li Zijian's first teacher.

Venerable Master Hsing Yun One-stroke Calligraphy Exhibition Hall
The third floor of Area B of the Venerable Master Hsing Yun One-stroke Calligraphy Exhibition Hall has Hsing Yun's calligraphies, which were donated by Li Zijian.

Public Access
Li Zijian Art Museum open to visitors for free. It is closed on Mondays, and is open from 10:00 am to 17:30 pm daily.

References

External links

 

Buildings and structures in Changsha
Cultural infrastructure completed in 2016
Museums in Hunan
Art museums established in 2016
2016 establishments in China
Yuelu District